Christian James Lambertsen (May 15, 1917 – February 11, 2011) was an American environmental medicine and diving medicine specialist who was principally responsible for developing the United States Navy frogmen's rebreathers in the early 1940s for underwater warfare. Lambertsen designed a series of rebreathers in 1940 (patent filing date: 16 Dec 1940) and in 1944 (patent issue date: 2 May 1944) and first called his invention breathing apparatus. Later, after the war, he called it Laru (acronym for Lambertsen Amphibious Respiratory Unit) and finally, in 1952, he changed his invention's name again to SCUBA (Self Contained Underwater Breathing Apparatus). Although diving regulator technology was invented by Émile Gagnan and Jacques-Yves Cousteau in 1943 and was unrelated  to rebreathers, the current use of the word SCUBA is largely attributed to the Gagnan-Cousteau invention. The US Navy considers Lambertsen to be "the father of the Frogmen".

Education
Lambertsen was born in Westfield, New Jersey, and raised in Scotch Plains, New Jersey, where he graduated from Scotch Plains-Fanwood High School in 1935; he was inducted into his high school's hall of fame in 2016. He attended Rutgers University in New Brunswick, New Jersey, graduating in 1939 with a bachelor of science degree. He graduated from University of Pennsylvania Medical School, Philadelphia, Pennsylvania in 1943.

Lambertsen was awarded an Honorary Doctor of Science Degree from Northwestern University in 1977.

Army career

Major Lambertsen served in the U.S. Army Medical Corps from 1944 to 1946.  He invented the first Self-contained Underwater Breathing Apparatus (SCUBA) and demonstrated it to the Office of Strategic Services (OSS) (after already being rejected by the U.S. Navy) in a pool at a hotel in Washington, D.C.  OSS not only bought into the concept, they hired Major Lambertsen to lead the program and build-up the dive element of their maritime unit.  He was vital in establishing the first cadres of U.S. military operational combat swimmers during late World War II.  The OSS was also the predecessor of the Central Intelligence Agency (CIA) and the maritime element still exists inside their Special Activities Division.

His responsibilities included training and developing methods of combining self-contained diving and swimmer delivery including the Lambertsen Amphibious Respiratory Unit for the OSS "Operational Swimmer Group". Following World War II, he trained U.S. forces in methods for submerged operations, including composite fleet submarine / operational swimmers activity.

Civilian career
From 1946 to 1953, Lambertsen served on the faculty of the Department of Pharmacology at the University of Pennsylvania School of Medicine, though he did spend a year as a Visiting Research Associate Professor from 1951 to 1952 for the Department of Physiology at University College London, England. Lambertsen spent the 1950s concentrating on national research needs in undersea medicine (see National Service Activities below). He again took an appointment as Professor of Pharmacology and Experimental Therapeutics at the University of Pennsylvania School of Medicine in 1962. He was also named Professor of Medicine in 1972 and Professor at the University of Pennsylvania School of Veterinary Medicine in 1976. Each of these appointments were held until 1987. In 1985, he became Emeritus Distinguished Professor of Environmental Medicine at the University of Pennsylvania.

Lambertsen was the founder and director  of The Environmental Biomedical Stress Data Center at the University of Pennsylvania in Philadelphia, Pennsylvania.

The University of Pennsylvania's annual Christian J. Lambertsen Honorary Lecture is named for him. On May 31, 2007, the guest speaker was Professor Marc Feldmann, head of Imperial College's Kennedy Institute of Rheumatology who is recognised for his discovery of anti-TNF treatment for rheumatoid arthritis. Dr. Lambertsen was in attendance.

Contributions to environmental medicine

Predictive Studies Series
Dr. Lambertsen's "Predictive Studies Series", spanning from 1969 with TEKTITE I to 1997, researched many aspects of humans in extreme environments.

Awards

University and national civilian awards and honors

 1948–1953	John and Mary R. Markle Scholar in Medical Science 		
 1965 University of Pennsylvania Alumni Award of Merit	
 1967 Lindback Award for Distinguished Teaching
 1969 NASA Commendation
 1970 Aerospace Medical Association Award
 1970 Undersea Medical Society Award
 1972 Marine Technology Society Award for Ocean  Science and Engineering
 1973 Underwater Society of America Award for Science
 1974 New York Academy of Sciences Award for Research in Environmental Science
 1977 Member, National Academy of Engineering
 1977 Doctor of Science Honorary Degree, Northwestern University
 1977 Fellow, College of Physicians of Philadelphia
 1978 Distinguished Award for Individuals, Offshore Technology Conference
 1979 Award in Environmental Science, Aerospace Medical Association
 1979 Award for Naval Undersea Research Training, Undersea Medical Society
 1980 Association of Diving Contractors Award
 1984 Endowed Visiting Lectureship, Sterling Pharmaceutical Corporation
 1989 Distinguished Medical Graduate Award, University of Pennsylvania
 1992 Boerema Award, Hyperbaric Oxygen Research, Undersea and Hyperbaric Medical Society
 1995 UDT-SEAL Association Lifetime Achievement Award
 1995 Department of Defense Citation
 1997 UDT-SEAL Association: Honorary Lifetime Membership
 1998 US Army Special Forces tab and Green Beret, formally inducted into 1st Special Forces Regiment US Army
 1999 Beneath the Sea: Lifetime Achievement Award
 2001 Pioneer Award – Navy Historical Society
 2001 CJL Oxygen Symposium X, Undersea and Hyperbaric Medical Society
 2007 American College of Physicians Fellowship Award 2007
 2010 The John Scott Award, City of Philadelphia

Military service and related awards

 1945 Legion of Merit, U.S. Army
 1945 Major General William J. Donovan, U.S.A., Director, Office of Strategic Services
 1945 Lt. Colonel H. Q. A. Reeves, British Army
 1945 Lt. Commander Derek A. Lee, R.N.V.R., Burma
 1945 Colonel Sylvester C. Missal, M.C., U.S.A., Chief Surgeon, Office of Strategic Services
 1945 Commander H. G. A. Wooley, D.S.C., R.N., Director, Maritime Unit, Office of Strategic Services
 1946 Presidential Unit Citation, O.S.S. Unit 101, Burma, Dwight D. Eisenhower
 1946 U.S. Army Commendation Ribbon, Citation from Major General Norman Kirk, M.C., Surgeon General, U.S. Army
 1946 Admiral J. F. Farley, Commandant, U.S. Coast Guard
 1946 Colonel H. W. Doan, M.C., Executive Officer, Surgeon General's Office, U.S. Army
 1947 Colonel George W. Read Jr., President, U.S. Army Ground Forces, Board No. 2
 1948 General Jacob L. Devers, U.S.A. Commanding General, U.S. Army Ground Forces
 1969 Meritorious Civilian Service Award, Secretary of the Navy
 1969 Military Oceanography Award, Secretary of the Navy
 1972 Department of Defense Distinguished Public Service Award
 1972 Secretary of the Navy Certificate of Commendation for Advisory Service, Committee on Undersea Warfare, National Academy of Sciences
 1976 Distinguished Public Service Award, United States Coast Guard
 1978 Certificate of Commendation for Outstanding Service on Secretary of the Navy Oceanographic Advisory Committee
 1995 British Embassy Citation
 1995 U.S. Army Special Forces Underwater Operations School Award: Lifetime Achievement
 1996 U.S. Special Forces Green Beret Award
 2001 U.S. Special Operations Command Medal
 2005 US Chief of Naval Operations Citation

National service activities
 1953–1960, 1962–1971    Committee on Naval Medical Research, National Research Council	
 1953–1972    Committee on Undersea Warfare, National Research Council
 1953–1956    Chairman, Panel on Underwater Swimmers, Committee on Undersea Warfare, National Research Council
 1954–1960    Chairman, Panel on Shipboard and Submarine Medicine, Committee on Naval Medicine Research, National Research Council
 1954–1961    Advisory Panel on Medical Sciences, Office of Assistant Secretary of Defense, R and E
 1955–1959    Consultant, U.S. Army Chemical Corps
 1959–1961    Consultant, Scientific Advisory Board, U.S. Air Force
 1960–1962    Chairman, Committee on Man-in-Space, Space Science Board, National Academy of Sciences
 1960–1962    Member, Space Science Board, National Academy of Sciences
 1962–1980    Consultant, Space Science Board, National Academy of Sciences
 1967–1970    Member, President's Space Panel, PSAC
 1968–1977    Oceanographic Advisory Committee, Office of Secretary of the Navy
 1972               Consultant to the Diving Physiology and Technology Panel, U.S.-Japan Cooperative Program in Natural Resources, U.S. Department of the Interior
 1972–1977    Biomedical Sciences Advisor, National Oceanic and Atmospheric Administration, U.S. Dept. of Commerce
 1973–1977    Member, The Marine Board, National Academy of Engineering
 1973               Member, Smithsonian Advisory Board
 1983               Chairman, Environmental Sciences Review Committee, National Aeronautics and Space Administration (NASA)
 1983–1986    National Undersea Research Center Advisory Board, National Oceanic and Atmospheric Administration
 1983–1985    Space Medicine Advisory Panel, National Aeronautics and Space Administration
 1984–1986    Lunar Base Planning Group, National Aeronautics and Space Administration
 1989–1991    NASA Radiation and Environmental Health Working Group
 1991–1993    NASA Life Sciences Division Environmental Biomedical Sciences Working Group
 1992               NASA Life Sciences. Science and Technical Requirements Document for Space Station Freedom
 1993               NASA JSC Medical Advisory Board, Hubble Space Telescope Repair EVA
 1995               NASA JSC "In-Suit" Doppler Panel
 1998               Chairman, NASA Advisory Panel, Committee on ISS Decompression Risk Definition & Contingency Plan
 1998–1999    Chairman, NASA Life Sciences Decompression Research Peer Reviews

Bibliography

Refereed journals

 

 Lambertsen, C. J. Physiologic factors in human organ oxygen tolerance extension. SPUMS 20(2): 109–120, April–May 1990.

 Gelfand, R., C.J. Lambertsen, J.M. Clark, N. Egawa and C.D. Puglia. Ventilatory and cardiac adjustments during rapid compressions to pressure equivalents of 400-800-1200-1600 feet of sea water. Med. Aeronaut. Spatiale Med. Subaquat. Hyperbare. 17(65): 114–116, 1978.
 Lambertsen, C.J., J.P.W. Cunnington and J.R.M. Cowley. The dynamics and composition of spontaneous, continuous gas embolism in the pig during isobaric gas counterdiffusion. Fed. Proc. 34: 452, 1975.

 Lambertsen, C.J., and R.W. Bullard (eds.). Temperature limitations in manned undersea and aerospace operations. Aerospace Med. 41: 1263–1288, 1970.

 Lambertsen, C.J. (ed.). Modern aspects of treatment of decompression sickness. Aerospace Med. 39: 1055–1093, 1968.

 

 

 Lambertsen, C.J. Problems of shallow water diving. Report based on experiences of operational swimmers of the Office of Strategic Services. Occup. Med. 3: 230–245, 1947.
 Lambertsen, C.J., and L. Godfrey. A small efficient hood for oxygen therapy. J.A.M.A. 125: 492–493, 1944.
 Lambertsen, C.J. A diving apparatus for life saving work. J.A.M.A. 116: 1387–1389, 1941.
 Atkinson, W.J. Jr., J.L. Dean, E.H. Kennerdell and C.J. Lambertsen. A multiple anomaly of the human heart and pulmonary veins. Anat. Record 78(3): 383–388, 1940.

Patents

 1944  for Use Under Water
 1944  for Use Under Water
 1947 
 1948  for Use Under Water
 1952  for Breathing Apparatus
 1957  for Oxygen Rebreathing Apparatus
 1959  for use Under Water
 1974 
 1974  for Underwater Work and Oil Trapping
 1989

See also

References

External links
 Lambertsen Publications
 National Academy of Engineering listing
 The Environmental Biomedical Stress Data Center Brochure
 A long biography about him, and about the rebreather that he designed
 Images of his rebreather
 New York Times Obituary
Christian J. Lambertsen Papers at Duke University Medical Center Archives

1917 births
2011 deaths
American medical researchers
United States Army personnel of World War II
American underwater divers
Diving engineers
People from Scotch Plains, New Jersey
People from Westfield, New Jersey
Recipients of the Legion of Merit
Rutgers University alumni
Scotch Plains-Fanwood High School alumni
United States Army Medical Corps officers
Perelman School of Medicine at the University of Pennsylvania alumni
University of Pennsylvania faculty
Members of the United States National Academy of Engineering
Military personnel from New Jersey